Østfold Police District (Norwegian: Østfold politidistrikt) is headquartered in Sarpsborg, Norway, serving the municipalities of Aremark, Fredrikstad, Halden, Hvaler, Marker, Moss, Rakkestad, Rygge, Rømskog, Råde, Sarpsborg and Våler. Other municipalities in Østfold county belong to Follo Police District. The police district is on the border with Sweden.

The district has police stations in Sarpsborg, Fredrikstad, Halden and Moss and six sheriff's offices (lensmannskontor).

The easiest way to contact the police in Østfold Police District is by telephone, emergency ☎ 112, non emergency calls at ☎ 02800 or ☎ (+47)69 11 33 00.

References

See also
 Norwegian Police Service

Police districts in Norway
Organisations based in Sarpsborg